Pompeo Morganti, also known as Pompeo da Fano (circa 1494 - 1568) was an Italian painter, active in the Marche.

He was born in Fano, the son of the painter Bartolomeo Morganti, also known as Bartolomeo di Matteo de' Marescalchi. Pompeo contributed a somewhat ghostly painting depicting the Apparition of the Virgin for the Sanctuary of the Beata Vergine delle Grazie in Montegridolfo.<ref>La Civiltà Cattolica, Issues 3595-3600, page 95: Review of Angelo Chiretti's book on  Il Santuario della Beata Vergine delle Grazie di Montegridolfo nelle opere di Pompeo Morganti (1494ca-1568) e Jacopo Venturi (1718-1803), Rimini, 1998.</ref> Vasari mentions that he (Pompeo da Fano) was briefly the teacher of Taddeo Zuccaro, while others mention his father Ottaviano. He painted a Raising Lazarus and St Michael defeats Satan'', now in the museum of the Art gallery of Fano.

References

16th-century Italian painters
Italian male painters
Italian Renaissance painters
1494 births
1568 deaths
People from Fano